The canton of Tain-l'Hermitage is an administrative division of the Drôme department, southeastern France. Its borders were modified at the French canton reorganisation which came into effect in March 2015. Its seat is in Tain-l'Hermitage.

It consists of the following communes:
 
Beaumont-Monteux
Chanos-Curson
Chantemerle-les-Blés
Châteauneuf-sur-Isère
Crozes-Hermitage
Érôme
Gervans
Granges-les-Beaumont
Larnage
Mercurol-Veaunes
Pont-de-l'Isère
La Roche-de-Glun
Serves-sur-Rhône
Tain-l'Hermitage

References

Cantons of Drôme